Marinella (born 20 May 1938, Thessaloniki) is one of the most popular Greek singers whose career has spanned several decades. She has sung professionally since 1957. Since the beginning of her career, she has released 66 solo  albums and has been featured on albums by other musicians. She still sings today and stands out for the range of her voice

Early life
She was born Kyriaki Papadopoulou (Κυριακή Παπαδοπούλου), in the city of Thessaloniki in northern Greece. Her parents were Greek refugees from Constantinople. She is the fourth and last child of a large family, which despite its poverty, was rich in love and in artistic vein. The whole family gathered around the turntable and sang, while her father tried to teach children the steps of the waltz and the tango. From the age of four years singing on the radio broadcast in "Pediki Ora (Children's Hour)" and later did ads for shops such as "Melka" in Thessaloniki, earning her first pocket money. She participated in many performances of children's theatre.

At age 15, she gave up her budding career to finish school, but by seventeen, her passion for the theatre is stirring and she joins the artistic group of Mary Laurent, a "mpoulouki" (so called then the singer troupes that traveled Greece end-to-end for performances) and plays small roles. One day, the lead singer fell sick and sought Marinella as a replacement, who was willing to take the singer's place. At that moment, the Greek music world found one of its best representatives. Marinella became the lead singer of the troupe. She later joined the Military Theatre because the remuneration was better. At the same time she started her career as a singer at the "Panorama" centre of Thessaloniki, where Tolis Harmas  coined the name "Marinella" for her, inspired by his song.

She released her first song in 1957, "Nitsa, Elenitsa (Little Helen)". Her early career was marked by her collaboration with singer Stelios Kazantzidis. Together they managed to become the greatest duet of Greece, unsurpassed even today. Starting at the night club "Luxembourg" in Thessaloniki where they enjoyed great success, they later moved to Athens, the capital, where they became widely known. They sang the songs of Mikis Theodorakis, Manos Hadjidakis, Vassilis Tsitsanis, Giorgos Mitsakis, Giorgos Zambetas, Apostolos Kaldaras, Theodoros Derveniotis, Stavros Xarchakos, Christos Leontis, whom are considered the best composers of the era.

Marinella married Stelios Kazantzidis on 7 May 1964 and they toured together in Germany and the United States. They divorced in September 1966. Marinella then began a solo career and eventually in 1974 married singer Tolis Voskopoulos. This second marriage also ended in divorce in 1981.

Early career
In October 1970, Marinella participated in the V Festival Internacional da Cançao Popular – Parte Internacion (FIC) in Rio de Janeiro, representing Greece with the song "Kyra Giorgena (Wife of George)", finishing 4th among 38 countries. On October 24, 1970, the Billboard wrote "Marinella from Greece, knows audiences in Athens clubs, carries enchantment in her songs and the warmth of the sun in her voice" (by Henry Johnston).

Marinella was the first Greek singer to participate in the International MIDEM Festival of 1973 in Cannes with and three new songs composed by Stavros Xarchakos and in the Eurovision Song Contest of 1974, placing eleventh with the song "Krasi, Thalassa Kai T' Agori Mou (Wine, sea and my boyfriend)". Greek rock band Nostradamos had won the first Eurovision participation contest ran by the state broadcaster ERT to represent Greece at Eurovision. However, due to a scandal, the band was not allowed to compete at Eurovision, and Marinella was sent instead.

She also performed in several Greek musicals, both as singer and actress. Her popularity rose in the late 1960s, 1970s and 1980s, with a string of successful albums and live shows. She developed a new standard for shows in the Greek night clubs, introducing costumes, dancing, and special lighting effects.

Later career
On 27 April 1998, Marinella performed in the Athens Concert Hall, performing her older hits to great acclaim. Her concert at the small Olympic Stadium of Athens on 1 October 1999 was a great success with more than 25,000 people.

In November 2002, she collaborated with George Dalaras. They performed concerts in Athens and Thessaloniki as well as abroad. The tour was titled "Mazi (Together)" and the released live album from these performances reached platinum status in 2003.

On 10 April 2003, The New York Times critic wrote about Marinella, "Her voice was earthy and strong, and she had the presence of an actress as she danced a few teasing steps or brought dignity to longing" (by Jon Pareles).

In March 2004, she released a brand new album with new songs by Nikos Antypas and Lina Nikolakopoulou, entitled "Ammos Itane (It was sand)". In the same year, on 19 August, she performed at the closing ceremony of the 2004 Summer Olympics, along with Dimitra Galani, Haris Alexiou, Yiannis Parios and George Dalaras. In December 2005, she released a new album titled "Tipota Den Ginete Tihea (Nothing is random)", composed by Giorgos Theofanous. The album reached gold status and includes duets with famous Greek singers, such as Antonis Remos and Glykeria. In 2006, two new compilations of Marinella were officially released, the first titled "Sti Skini (On stage)" and containing older live recordings and the second one titled "Ta Logia Ine Peritta – 50 Chronia Tragoudi (Words are pointless – 50 Years of song)", which is a complete eight CDs boxset with Marinella's greatest hits from the beginning of her career until her collaboration with Kostas Hatzis at "Recital". She returned to nightlife, by performing live with Antonis Remos at the Athens Arena in 2006–07 and 2007–08, with Giannis Parios at the Diogenis Studio in the winter season 2008–09, and with Natassa Theodoridou at the Votanikos in 2011–12, in Athens.

Versatility
Even though Marinella is often considered a singer of folk songs, her range is quite broad and has included a variety of musical styles including traditional, laika, pop, blues, and jazz. Marinella is characterised as "The Great Lady of Song" in Greece, where she is regarded with great respect. She rarely makes public appearances, and her concerts are few and far between.

Discography

Studio albums 
1964: Kazantzidis & Marinella – Megales Epitihies (Great hits)
1965: Chrysos Diskos Kazantzidi & Marinellas (Golden record)
1967: Anapolontas (Remembering with Stelios Kazanztidis and Marinella)
1969: Stalia - Stalia (Drop by drop)
1969: Kazantzidis & Marinella
1969: Otan Simani Esperinos (When the evening bells are ringing)
1969: Marinella
1970: Ena Tragoudi Ein' I Zoi Mou (A song is my life)
1970: Kazantzidis & Marinella Sing Greek Songs
1971: Marinella – Enas Mythos (A tale)
1972: Athanata Rebetika (Immortal Rebetiko songs)
1973: Albania
1974: Marinella Gia Panta (Marinella forever) – Cyprus release
1974: Marinella & Voskopoulos
1974: Marinella & Tolis Voskopoulos – Ego Ki' Esy (You and I)
1975: Marinella Gia Panta (Marinella forever)
1976: Alli Mia Fora (Once again)
1977: Marinella & Athenians
1978: I Marinella Tou Simera (Marinella of today)
1979: S' Agapo (I love you)
1980: I Marinella Se Tragoudia Tis Vembo (Marinella in songs of Vembo)
1981: Marinella – Gia 'Senane Mporo (For you, I can)
1983: Gia 'Sena Ton Agnosto (For you, the unknown)
1984: Megales Stigmes (Great times)
1985: I Agapi Mas (Our love)
1986: Mia Nihta (One night)
1987: Marinella & Kostas Hatzis – Synantisi (Meeting)
1988: Tolmo (I dare)
1989: Eisai Mia Thiella (You're a storm)
1990: Lege Mou "S' agapo" (Keep telling me "I love you")
1991: Stelios Kazantzidis & Marinella – Ta Tragoudia Tis Amerikis (The songs of America)
1992: I Marinella Tragouda Mimi Plessa (Marinella sings Mimis Plessa)
1992: I Marinella Tragouda Megales Kyries (Marinella sings great Ladies)
1993: To Ximeroma Tou Erota (The dawn of love)
1994: I Marinella Tragouda Hatzinasio (Marinella sings George Hadjinasio)
1995: Ta Prota Mou Tragoudia (My first songs 1967 – 1970)
1996: Ta Prota Mou Tragoudia Nο. 2 (My first songs No. 2 1971 – 1974)
1997: Gia Proti Fora (For the first time)
1997: Tragoudia Apo Tis 45' Strofes (Songs of 45' rpm vinyl records)
2004: Ammos Itane (It was sand)
2005: Tipota Den Ginete Tihea (Νothing is random)

Live albums 
1972: Mia Vradia Me Tin Marinella (An evening with Marinella)
1973: Mia Vradia Me Tin Marinella No. 2 (An evening with Marinella no. 2)
1976: Marinella & Kostas Hatzis – Recital
1980: Marinella & Kostas Hatzis – To Tam-Tam (The tam-tam)
1998: I Marinella Tragouda Ke Thimate (Marinella sings and remembers)
1999: Me Varka To Tragoudi (With boat the song)
2003: Marinella & George Dalaras – Mazi (Together)
2007: Marinella & Antonis Remos – Live

Soundtracks 
1971: Ena Karavi Gemato Tragoudia (A boat full of songs)
1991: I Pariziana (The Parisienne)
1995: I Prova Tou Nifikou (Fitting of the wedding dress)
1995: Gorgones Ke Magkes (Mermaids and tough guys)
2000: Ystera Irthan I Melisses (And then, came the bees)

Collaborations
1962: Mikis Theodorakis – Greek Serenade
1963: Kostas Virvos – Pikres Ke Hares
1963: Mikis Theodorakis No. 1
1963: Holiday in Greece
1965: Stelios Kazantzidis Sings
1965: The Voice of Stelios Kazantzidis
1965: Stelios Kazantzidis No. 2
1965: Vassilis Tsitsanis – Synnefiasmeni Kyriaki
1965: Manos Hadjidakis – Proti Ektelesi
1965: Christos Leontis – Katahnia
1965: Stelios Kazantzidis No. 3
1965: Tragoudia Tis Xenitias
1965: Dodeka Megales Epitihies Tou Miki Theodoraki
1965: Stelios Kazantzidis – Tragoudiste Mazi Mou
1965: Retsina Ke Mpouzouki No. 3
1966: Christos Leontis – Anastasi Oneiron
1968: Kazantzides
1968: Stelios Kazantzidis – Stigmes
1970: V Festival Internacional Da Canção Popular – Rio (Parte Internacional)
1971: Christos Leontis – Dodeka Para Pente
1971: 12 Syghrona Laika Chromata
1972: Stelios Kazantzidis No. 4
1972: To 13ari Tis Epitichias
1973: Njihovi Uspesi
1974: Eurovision 1974
1974: Mikis Theodorakis No. 2
1974: Kryfa Minymata 1967 - 1974
1974: Stelios Kazantzidis No. 5
1975: Tolis Voskopoulos – Ego Ti Eho Ke Ti Tha 'Ho
1976: Tolis Voskopoulos – Smyrneika Ke Laika
1976: Tolis Voskopoulos – Otan Tragoudo
1976: Stelios Kazantzidis No. 6 · Marinella
1976: Mikis Theodorakis – Politeia
1977: Nasos Panagiotou – Ilie Megale
1977: O Kazantzidis Se Dimotika Tragoudia
1977: Dimotiki Anthologia No. 3
1977: Stelios Kazantzidis No. 8
1978: Stelios Kazantzidis – Monaxia Mou
1978: Tolis Voskopoulos – Tragouda Theatrine!
1979: Akis Panou – Ase Me Zoi
1980: Tolis Voskopoulos – 80
1981: Giannis Kalatzis – Gia Olous
1981: Voskopoulos – Kardia Mou Moni
1981: Stelios Kazantzidis 1953-60
1981: Stelios Kazantzidis 1961-63
1982: Tolis Voskopoulos – Den Thelo Na Thimame
1982: O Stelios Kazantzidis Tragouda Mpampi Mpakali
1982: Stelios Kazantzidis – I Megales Epitichies Tou
1983: Giannis Spartakos – 50 Chronia Tragoudi
1983: 30 Chryses Epitihies Tou Miki Theodoraki No. 2
1983: 30 Chronia Kaldaras No. 2
1983: Manos Hadjidakis – 30 Spanies Erminies No. 2
1983: Ta 14 Chasapisa Tou Hthes Ke Tou Simera
1984: Stelios Kazantzidis – Anekdota Tragoudia Stis 33' Strofes
1984: Antonis Kalogiannis – Mikra Erotika
1984: Kostas Virvos – Tesseris Dekaeties
1985: Kazantzidis – Mia Gyneka Efyge (Anekdota Tragoudia Stis 33' Strofes)
1985: Kazantzidis Gia Panta No. 1 (Historical recordings 1952 – 1963)
1985: Mikis Theodorakis & Manos Hadjidakis - Synavlies 1961 (Live)
1985: O Mikis Theodorakis Sto Kentrikon (Live)
1985: Ta Laika Tis Nichtas (Athens by night)
1985: Antonis Kalogiannis – Ke Pou les Eftichia
1985: Gia Ta Pedia
1986: Kazantzidis Gia Panta No. 2 (Historical recordings 1952 – 1963)
1986: Stelios Kazantzidis – Tora
1987: Takis Bougas – Ring
1987: Manolis Chiotis – To Deka To Kalo
1988: O Giannis Markopoulos Ston Elliniki Kinimatografo
1988: Giannis Parios – Pistos
1990: Ola mesa
1990: Klisis, Proklisis, Prosklisis
1990: Stelios Kazantzidis – Anekdota Tragoudia Stis 33' Strofes nο. 3
1993: San Palio Cinema
1995: En Plo (Ypourgio Emporikis Naftilias)
1996: Mpampis Mpakalis – Megales Epitichies
1996: Lefka Christougenna
1996: Stelios Kazantzidis – Tragoudia Apo Tis 45' Strofes
1997: Giorgos Zampetas – Tragoudia Apo Tis 45' Strofes
1997: Stelios Kazantzidis – Tragoudia Apo Tis 45' Strofes No. 2
2000: Kazantzidis – Tragoudia Apo Tis 45' Strofes no. 3
2002: O Stelios Kazantzidis Tragouda Manoli Chioti
2002: Mimis Plessas – Iobilaion (Live)
2004: Fos (The Official ATHENS 2004 Olympic Game Greek Album) 2004
2005: Antonis Remos – San Anemos
2006: Den Xero Poso S' Agapo – Tribute To Vicky Mosholiou (Live)
2006: Stelios Kazantzidis – Ta Kinimatografika
2006: 40 Chronia Dimitris Mitropanos
2008: Manos Hadjidakis – 100 Tragoudia (Recordings 1955 - 1972)
2008: Tha Pio Apopse To Feggari – Tribute To Lefteris Papadopoulos (Live)
2008: Mpampis Mpakalis – 40 Megales Epitihies
2008: Hroniko Tou Laikou Tragoudiou 1958
2010: Stelios Kazantzidis – Laiko Tragoudi (National Geographic)
2012: Natasa Theodoridou – Apenanti
2014: Giorgos Theofanous – Tragoudo To Nisi Mou (Live) – Cyprus release
2015: Giorgos Theofanous – Choës – Cyprus release

Compilations
1974: Ta Oraiotera Tragoudia Mou
1976: Portraita
1978: Ta Prota Mou Tragoudia
1980: Portraito
1982: 15 Chronia Marinella (2xLP)
1987: 14 Apo Ta Oraiotera Tragoudia Mou
1988: Marinella For Ever
1988: Mia Vradia Me Tin Marinella (1972 - 1973)
1988: Gia panta / Ta Erotika (2xLP)
1992: Marinella & Antonis Kalogiannis – Synesthimata
1993: Chryses Epitihies (2xLP)
1993: Stelios Kazantzidis & Marinella – I Megales Erminies
1993: Marinella & Tolis Voskopoulos – Oles I Megales Epitihies (2xLP)
1994: Ta Erotika (2xLP)
1995: Stelios Kazantzidis & Marinella – I Megales Epitihies
1996: I Marinella Tragouda Giorgo Zampeta & Aki Panou
1996: I Marinella Tragouda Mimi Plessa & Gianni Spano
1996: Ta 45aria Tis Marinellas
1996: I Megali Kyria Tou Ellinikou Tragoudiou
1996: Marinella & Kostas Hatzis – Synantisi Gia Recital
1997: Marinella & Kostas Hatzis – Recital Gia Dio (4xCD Boxset)
1997: Stelios Kazantzidis & Marinella – I Proti Agapi Sou Eime Ego
1997: Marinella & Tolis Voskopoulos – M' Emathes N' Agapo
1997: I Foni Ke O Mythos / 30 Chronia Tragoudi (4xCD Boxset)
1998: I Marinella Se Aprovleptes Erminies
1998: Ta Agapimena (Difono)
1999: Ta Tragoudia Mou (Diva)
2000: Ta Megala Tragoudia
2001: Marinella & Kostas Hatzis – Ta Tragoudia Tou Aiona
2001: Marinella / Delta Club (4xCD Boxset)
2001: I Megaliteres Epitihies
2002: Chrysa Tragoudia (2xCD Boxset)
2003: Marinella – Mia Agkalia Tragoudia (4xCD Boxset)
2005: Ego (The Very Best of EMI Years) 1957 – 1995 (2xCD)
2005: Marinella (The Universal Masters Collection)
2006: Kazantzidis & Marinella – Asteria Tou Ellinikou Tragoudiou
2006: Kazantzidis & Marinella – I Teleftaies Kines Ichografisis
2006: Sti Skini (2xCD)
2006: Ta Logia Eine Peritta / 50 Chronia Tragoudi 1956 - 2006(8xCD Boxset)
2007: Tragoudia Apo Ton Kinimatografo Ke To Theatro (LP)
2008: I Foni Ke O Mythos (4xCD)
2009: Ta Tragoudia Mias Zois (5xCD)

DVDs
 ΙΙΙ F.I.C. Festival Internacional Da Canção 1968 Rio
 2004 – Athens 2004 Olympic Games

Marinella in Greek cinema
The following table is a record of all instances of Marinella in films of Greek cinema, from the 1960 by 1966 with Stelios Kazantzidis and from 1967 by 1970 itself.

Video sampling

References

External links
Marinella – Fan Club in Pathfinder
ΜΑΡΙΝΕΛΛΑ – Διαδικτυακό Αφιέρωμα

1938 births
Living people
Arion Music Awards winners
Eastern Orthodox Christians from Greece
Eurovision Song Contest entrants of 1974
Greek actresses
Eurovision Song Contest entrants for Greece
20th-century Greek women singers
Greek laïko singers
Greek entehno singers
Greek rebetiko singers
Universal Music Greece artists
PolyGram Records (Greece) artists
Minos EMI artists
Musicians from Thessaloniki
Singers from Thessaloniki
Thessaloniki Song Festival entrants
Greek Macedonians